National Highway 119A (NH-119A) or Patna-Arrah-Sasaram highway is a proposed 4/6-lane wide National Highway in Bihar, India. The NH-119A starts from Sadisopur in Patna district to Suara near Dehri-on-Sone in Rohtas district, via Arrah in Bhojpur district. This highway mostly runs along Sone river.

Route
The route of NH-119A from north to south is as follows:

 Sadisopur (Patna)
 Arrah (Bhojpur)
 Dehri (Rohtas)

Junctions

Status updates
 Oct 2022: Land acquisition going on in all 3 districts of Bihar by the NHAI.

See also 
 List of National Highways in India
 List of National Highways in India by state

References

External links 

National highways in India
National Highways in Bihar